The Maudes Trophy is a motorcycle award established in 1923 by George Pettyt, owner of Maudes Motor Mart based in Great Portland Street, London who promoted an impartially-observed endurance test for motorcycles and provided a challenge award to the ACU who participated by acting as the body responsible for providing observers. Pettyt donated a silver trophy for the Auto-Cycle Union (ACU) to award annually, although over the years attempts proved to be infrequent.

Winners

References

British awards
Motorcycle racing